is an original Japanese anime television series animated by Zexcs, directed by Seishirō Nagaya and Toshimasa Kuroyanagi and written by Toshizo Nemoto. The series aired from April to June 2021. A manga adaptation by Kei Sakuraba was serialized in Kodansha's Dessert manga magazine from January 22 to September 24, 2021. An anime film premiered on July 2, 2022.

Story

Shotaro Futaba loved sports, but was never good enough. But watching a group of gymnasts in the park and seeing them in a  gymnastics tournament, he decides to join their school and become part of the gymnastic team. With new members, Shotaro and Ryoya Misato, the team aims for the upcoming Inter-High tournament.

Characters

Sōshūkan High School
Also known as Ao High School. Their men's rhythmic gymnastics team is attempting to perform at the Inter-High for the first time.

The protagonist and a first year student. He played a number of sports before high school, but was always on the sidelines. After witnessing a performance of the Sōshūkan men's rhythmic gymnastic team at a tournament, he joins their club, even though he has no gymnastics experience. He is inspired by Misato and his senior teammates.

A first year and the ace of his gymnastics team in middle school. He joined Sōshūkan because he was inspired by the coach's performance. He is an orphan who lived with his aunt. He is rather stoic, but he makes an effort to rely on his teammates. He is a major inspiration for Shōtarō.

A third year and the captain of the Sōshūkan men's rhythmic gymnastics team. He is  enthusiastic and encouraging. He was very involved in recruiting members to raise the team to 6. His interests in gymnastics began after seeing Shūsaku's backflips. His family has a sasa kamaboko business. His rival is Takase.

A third year and vice captain, an all rounder in gymnastics and a calm and collected type. He was inspired to join the team after seeing Shichigahama's backflip. He likes moss and plants. His family manages a shrine.

A third year and the ace of the Sōshūkan men's rhythmic gymnastics team. He joined the team after he got interested seeing Shichigahama's backflip. A running gag is him coming up with new nicknames for Shōtarō and Masato, which the two juniors always reject. He is an ardent fan of Masami Kudo, a member of the idol group Tan Tan Girls. His father is a fishmonger.

A second year. He joined the men's rhythmic gymnastics club after seeing his seniors perform. He acts tough, but he has a soft heart. He is a very big fan of yakuza movies. His family manages a ramen shop, and he's good at cooking.

The coach of the Sōshūkan men's rhythmic gymnastics club. He is the inspiration of the Sōshūkan men's rhythmic gymnastics club members. He was formerly the ace of Hakumei University, capable enough to make Men's Rhythmic Gymnastic become an Olympic event. He was arrogant, but after retiring from performing due to a leg injury, he became a patient individual. He often attributes his advice to his wife, though the gymnastics team has never met her.

The manager of the club, she is also Shida's relative. She is quiet, but well integrated with the rest of the team. She is tech savvy, and uses videos and software to review practices and mimic choreography. She designs the team's costumes.

Hakumei University Affiliated High School

A first year prodigy. Similar to Futaba, he was in multiple clubs before a rhythmic gymnastics club, but he quit them because he found them boring. He started gymnastics after seeing Misato perform and stayed since Misato provides him good competition. He initially didn't have much interest in Futaba, but later becomes curious after seeing him perform. He is mostly aloof and playful, doing things at his own pace. He gets involved in games so much that he doesn't notice his seniors trying to contact him. 

A third year student and the captain of the team. He's been Shichigahama's rival since their first meeting. He considers Ao High to be worthy rivals.

A third year student and the vice-captain of the team. He helps manage the captain's excessive emotions. Though he always stops Takase from scolding Mashiro, Mashiro is more scared of him. He is impressed by the performance of Ao high students and considers them worthy rivals.

A second year student. He is a fan of Kazamaura Aki from Aomori Nebuta Dream and has a rivalry with Onagawa over what type of idols they like.

A second year student. He has a calm and aloof personality. He is good with plants and arranges flowers to look better and hold longer when he sees them. He shares a friendship with Tsukidate due to their common interest in plants.

A first year student. He is the loudest in the team and also a fan of yakuza movies, albeit preferring characters which get the girl and win in the end, as opposed to Watari's preferences.

The coach of Hakumei Private High School and alumni of Hakumei University. He was captain of the team when Shida was on it. He believes that if Shida hadn't retired due to injury, he could have taken Men's Rhythmic Gymnastic to a level where it would have become a part of Olympics. He was also one of the few who lent a helping hand to Shida after his injury.

Other characters

Production and release
On November 4, 2020, Fuji TV announced the original anime television series, which is part of the "Zutto Ōen Project 2011 + 10...", commemorating the 10th anniversary of the 2011 Tōhoku earthquake and tsunami.  The series is animated by Zexcs, directed by Seishirō Nagaya and Toshimasa Kuroyanagi and written by Toshizo Nemoto.  Original character designs are provided by Robico, the author of My Little Monster, while Yūki Shibata adapts the designs for animation. Yuki Hayashi is composing the series' music.  It aired in Fuji TV's Noitamina programming block from April 9 to June 25, 2021. Centimillimental performed the series' opening theme song "Seishun no Enbu", while wacci performed the series' ending theme song "Anata ga Iru". Crunchyroll licensed the series outside of Asia.

After the conclusion of the anime series, an anime film has been announced.  It premiered on July 2, 2022, with returning staff and cast.

Episode list

Notes

References

External links
Anime official website 

2021 anime television series debuts
Anime with original screenplays
Aniplex
Crunchyroll anime
Gymnastics in anime and manga
Kodansha manga
Medialink
Noitamina
Shōjo manga
Zexcs